Ionuţ Mihai Bâlbă (born 1 November 1981) is a Romanian retired football player who played as a striker. He played mainly for Politehnica Iaşi and made 142 appearances, scoring 35 goals in the Liga I.

External links
 
 

1981 births
Living people
People from Pașcani
Romanian footballers
Association football forwards
Liga I players
Liga II players
FC Politehnica Iași (2010) players
FC Botoșani players
ACF Gloria Bistrița players
CSM Jiul Petroșani players